Baden is a historical territory in South Germany, in earlier times on both sides of the Upper Rhine but since the Napoleonic Wars only East of the Rhine.

History 
The margraves of Baden originated from the House of Zähringen. Baden is named after the margraves' residence, Hohenbaden Castle in Baden-Baden. Hermann II of Baden first claimed the title of Margrave of Baden in 1112. A united Margraviate of Baden existed from this time until 1535, when it was split into the two Margraviates of Baden-Durlach and Baden-Baden. Following a devastating fire in Baden-Baden in 1689, the capital was moved to Rastatt.

The two parts were reunited in 1771 under Margrave Charles Frederick. The restored Margraviate with its capital Karlsruhe was elevated to the status of electorate in 1803. In 1806, the Electorate of Baden, receiving territorial additions, became the Grand Duchy of Baden. 

The Grand Duchy of Baden was a state within the German Confederation until 1866 and the German Empire until 1918, succeeded by the Republic of Baden within the Weimar Republic and Nazi Germany. From 1945 to 1952, South Baden and Württemberg-Baden were territories under French and American occupation, respectively. They were united with Württemberg-Hohenzollern to form the modern Federal State of Baden-Württemberg in 1952.

Geography 
Baden lies in the southwest of Germany, with most of its major cities on the Upper Rhine Plain. Bounded by Lake Constance on the south and by the river Rhine on the south and west, the region of Baden stretches from the Linzgau, Lörrach and Freiburg im Breisgau to Karlsruhe and then on to Mannheim, leading to the Main and Tauber rivers.

To its west lies the French historical region of Alsace, to its south Switzerland, the Palatinate to its northwest, Hesse to the north, and parts of Bavaria to the northeast.

See also

 History of Baden-Württemberg
 List of states in the Holy Roman Empire

References

 

 
Former monarchies of Europe
History of Baden-Württemberg